Tržac is a village in the municipality of Cazin, Una-Sana Canton, Bosanska Krajina region, western Bosnia and Herzegovina.

Geography
It is located close to the border with Croatia, lying on hillside terrain above the Korana river and its right tributary Mutnica. The climate is  medium continental, with cold winters and warm summers.

History
Throughout its history, Tržac appeared for the first time in the 11th century as a settlement in the central part of medieval Kingdom of Croatia. From the 13th century the village and its surrounding area (including Tržac Castle) were owned by members of the prominent Croatian Frankopan family, even giving the name to one of the family branches (Tržački). The Ottomans conquered it by the end of the 16th century, pushing the Croatian defenders to the west, and populated the area with Muslim inhabitants. In the following centuries this area was called Turkish Croatia and finally renamed to Bosanska Krajina in the 19th century.

Demographics
According to the 2013 census, its population was 318.

See also 
 Cazin
 Una-Sana Canton
 Frankopan family tree

References

External links
Federal Bureau of statistics – official number of inhabitants
From the history of Tržac
Photos
Video

Populated places in Cazin